The  was a Japanese space agency, which was founded by the Ministry of International Trade and Industry in 1986. Unlike NASDA, ISAS, and NAL, it was not included in the JAXA organization, which was founded in 2003. The chairperson is Ichiro Taniguchi.

In 2012, USEF merged two other organizations—Earth Remote Sensing Data Analysis Center (ERSDAC) and Japan Resources Observation System Organization (JAROS)—to form a new organization Japan Space Systems (J-spacesystems).

Goal
The aim of USEF is technology development, especially the testing of commercial off-the-shelf parts (COTS), robotics, material sciences and technology for optical earth observations.

Launch vehicle
Unlike the JAXA organisation, USEF doesn't have its own launch vehicle. Instead, it has used either the H-IIA, the M-3S, or Russian rockets, so far. However, in 2008, METI mentioned the possibility of USEF developing an air-launched vehicle for small payloads.

Completed missions

EXPRESS
The Experiment Re-entry Space System (EXPRESS) was a 745 kg (1,642 lb) satellite for microgravity experiments and testing of re-entry technologies. The project was done in cooperation with ISAS (now JAXA) and DLR of Germany. On January 15, 1995, it was launched on the M-3S. However, due to a problem with the rocket, the orbit was much lower than planned. The re-entry capsule was found later in Ghana.

SERVIS 1

The SERVIS-1 is an 840 kg (1,851 lb) technology test mission with COTS parts. It was launched on October 30, 2001, with the Russian Rockot launch vehicle. the mission duration was two years.

USERS
Unmanned Space Experiment Recovery System (USERS) was launched on the H-IIA on September 10, 2002. The aim of the mission was microgravity experiments to perform the Super-Conductor Material Processing Experiment and also testing of satellite bus technologies. For the first part of the mission, USERS carried a return capsule. It was retrieved successfully on May 29, 2003. The mission of the main orbiter ended during re-entry in 2007.

SERVIS 2

SERVIS-2 was a 900 kg (1,984 lb) technology test mission with COTS parts. It will continue the experiments done with the first SERVIS satellite.  It was launched on June 2, 2010, 01:59 UTC, with the Russian Rockot launch vehicle.

ASNARO missions

ASNARO 1
ASNARO-1, the first of "Advanced Satellite with New system Architecture Observation" series, is a 450 kg (992 lb) earth observation satellite. The expected resolution is less than 0.5 meter (1.6 ft) from an SSO orbit. The
satellite was launched on 2014 Nov 6 by a Dnepr rocket from Yasniy, Russia.

ASNARO 2
ASNARO 2 is small X-band radar satellite for Earth observation. The satellite was launched on 17 January 2018 by an Epsilon rocket.

Other technology projects
USEF developed the robotic arm of the ETS-VII project to test docking technology in the 1990s.

Demonstration of Green Propellant reaction control system (GPRCS) was originally under development for SERVIS-3 project.  Eventually it was launched and demonstrated successfully aboard RAPIS-1 in 2019.

Hyperspectral Imager Suite (HISUI) was launched aboard SpaceX CRS-19 on 5 December 2019 to the International Space Station and installed at the External Facility of the Japanese Experiment Module Kibo.

References

External links
 

Space program of Japan
Space agencies